Italy–Netherlands relations are the foreign relations between the Italian Republic and the Kingdom of the Netherlands. 

Italy has an embassy in The Hague and a consulate general in Amsterdam. The Netherlands has an embassy in Rome, a consulate general in Milan and 14 honorary consulates in Ancona, Bari, Bologna, Cagliari, Catania, Florence, Genoa, Livorno, Naples, Palermo, Trieste, Turin, Venice and Verona. 

Both countries are full members of the European Union, the North Atlantic Treaty Organization and the Organisation for Economic Co-operation and Development.

See also 
 Foreign relations of Italy
 Foreign relations of the Netherlands
 Dutch people in Italy 
 Italians in the Netherlands

References

External links 
 Dutch Ministry of Foreign Affairs about the relation with Italy (in Dutch only)
Dutch representations in Italy
Dutch embassy in Rome (in Dutch and Italian only)
Dutch general consulate in Milan(in Dutch and Italian only)
 Italian embassy in The Hague (in Dutch and Italian only)
Italian general consulate in Amsterdam (in Dutch and Italian only) 

 
Italy
Netherlands